A sealed crustless sandwich is a foodstuff comprising a filling sealed between two layers of bread by a crimped edge, with the crust subsequently removed. A popular variety in the United States is peanut butter and jelly. Sealed crustless sandwiches are mass-produced by The J. M. Smucker Company under the brand name "Uncrustables".

The United States Patent and Trademark Office has issued a number of patents for various versions of sealed crustless sandwiches. The 6004596 patent has been especially controversial since, according to critics, it patents an obvious and well known concept. On September 25, 2007, the Patent and Trademark Office concluded a reexamination of the 6004596 patent and issued a certificate cancelling all claims.

The sandwich has been humorously categorized as a dumpling or ravioli because of its crimping, analogous to a Pop-Tart being classified similarly.

Controversial patent

The first claim of Menusaver's patent reads:
 A sealed crustless sandwich, comprising:
 a first bread layer having a first perimeter surface coplanar to a contact surface;
 at least one filling of an edible food juxtaposed to said contact surface;
 a second bread layer juxtaposed to said at least one filling opposite of said first bread layer, wherein said second bread layer includes a second perimeter surface similar to said first perimeter surface;
 a crimped edge directly between said first perimeter surface and said second perimeter surface for sealing said filling(s) between said first bread layer and said second bread layer;
 wherein a crust portion of said first bread layer and said second bread layer has been removed.

That is, the patent described a sandwich with a layer of filling in between two pieces of bread which are crimped shut and have their crust removed. The other nine claims of the patent elaborate the idea further, including the coating of two sides of the bread with peanut butter first before putting the jelly in the middle, so that the jelly would not seep into the bread—the layers  of filling "are engaged to one another to form a reservoir for retaining the second filling in between".

Many intellectual property experts and members of the general public view this patent as an example of the patent office's inability to properly examine patent applications. The patent examiner cited only seven previous patents issued between 1963 and 1998, and a 1994 book called 50 Great Sandwiches that were deemed relevant to the novelty and nonobviousness of the invention. He concluded that the invention was indeed novel and not obvious and allowed the claims.

Since then, many more earlier patents and publications have been found that teach some or all of the different aspects of the invention.  These include a 1949 patent that describes a device to create these types of sandwiches: "An object of this invention is to provide... a means for locating said filling in the center of the sandwich and sealing the marginal edges of the pieces by heat and pressure to preclude the escape of filling from the finished product... [and] a means for trimming the baked dough pieces". These new pieces of prior art have been brought to the attention of the patent office through a reexamination proceeding.  (See below)

The J.M. Smucker Co. also attempted to patent the process of making the sandwich in 2004 (rather than just the sandwich itself) and on April 8, 2005, had its application rejected by the U.S. Court of Appeals for the Federal Circuit (CAFC)..

Patent enforcement
In 2001, a small grocery and caterer in Gaylord, Michigan, Albie's Food, Inc., was sent a cease and desist letter from The J.M. Smucker Co., accusing Albie's of violating their intellectual property rights to the "sealed crustless sandwich". Instead of capitulating, Albie's took the case to federal court, noting in their filings a pocket sandwich with crimped edges and no crust was called a "pasty" and had been a popular dish in northern Michigan since the nineteenth century. Federal Court determined that Albie's Foods did not infringe on  J.M. Smucker Co. intellectual property rights and was allowed to continue, overturning J.M. Smucker Co. cease and desist.

Patent reexamination

In March 2001, during the legal proceedings, Albie's filed a request for reexamination with the USPTO asking that the patent be reexamined in light of the new prior art. The reexamination serial number is 90/005,949.

In response to the new prior art cited, Smucker's narrowed the wording of their claims to only cover a very specific version of their sealed crustless sandwich. The more narrow claims, for example, only cover sealed crustless peanut butter and jelly sandwiches where the jelly is held between two layers of peanut butter. Nonetheless, in December 2003, the patent examiner rejected the narrowed claims in light of the new prior art.

Smucker's appealed the rejection to the Board of Patent Appeals and Interferences (BPAI). In September 2006, The BPAI reversed the examiner's reasons for rejecting the claims, but found new reasons for rejecting them. They found that the wording in the narrowed claims was too vague to clearly identify exactly what Smucker's is trying to patent. Because Smucker's failed to respond to the BPAI's rejections within the two-month deadline, the PTO mailed a Notice of Intent to Issue a Reexamination Certificate (NIIRC) in December 2006 cancelling all claims. The reexamination certificate was issued on September 25, 2007.

Commercial sales
, Smucker's is selling the unpatented sandwiches under the "Uncrustables" trademark. The company built a plant in 2004 in Scottsville, Kentucky, to produce the product. The food item was utilized extensively during the 2018 California wildfires by firefighters; it has been a staple in the brown bags which food is handed out to firefighters.

J.M. Smucker sold $365 million worth of Uncrustables between April 2019 and April 2020 and are projected to sell $500 million in the next year. The company also announced they will be building a new $1.1 billion plant in McCalla, Alabama to produce the sandwiches and will employ up to 750 people.

See also
 List of sandwiches

Notes

References
 Adam B. Jaffe and Josh Lerner, Innovation and its Discontents: How our broken patent system is endangering innovation and progress, and what to do about it (Princeton, NJ: Princeton University Press, 2004), 25–26, 32–34.

Patent law
Patented foods
The J.M. Smucker Co. brands
American sandwiches